Black Box Recordings may refer to : 
Black Box Music, a hip hop label
Blackbox Recordings, a hardcore punk label